Ithomiola  is a butterfly genus in the butterfly family Riodinidae present only in the Neotropical realm.

Species
Ithomiola buckleyi Hall & Willmott, 1998 present in Ecuador and Peru
Ithomiola callixena (Hewitson, 1870 present in Ecuador, Colombia and Peru
Ithomiola cascella (Hewitson, 1870) present in Ecuador, Colombia and Peru
Ithomiola celtilla (Hewitson, 1870) present in Ecuador
Ithomiola floralis C. & R. Felder, [1865] present in French Guiana, Suriname and Bolivia
Ithomiola rubrolineata Lathy, 1904 present in Peru

Biology
Known as the glasswing mimic, Ithomiola floralis is protected by resembling Ithomiinae species.

Sources 
funet

External links

TOL

Riodininae
Riodinidae of South America
Butterfly genera
Taxa named by Baron Cajetan von Felder
Taxa named by Rudolf Felder